Ferdinand Vega (30 April 1936 – 26 February 2021) was a Puerto Rican archer. He competed in the men's individual event at the 1972 Summer Olympics. Vega was a Command Chief Master Sergeant in the Puerto Rico Air National Guard. Vega died on 26 February 2021. He was buried at the Puerto Rico National Cemetery.

References

External links
 

1936 births
2021 deaths
Puerto Rican male archers
Olympic archers of Puerto Rico
Archers at the 1972 Summer Olympics
People from Santurce, Puerto Rico
Puerto Rico National Guard personnel
United States Air Force airmen